Allen Johnson (born 1971) is a retired American hurdler.

Allen Johnson may also refer to:

Allen Johnson (Indian Army officer) (1829–1907), British Indian Army officer
Allen Johnson (historian) (1870–1931), American historian, Professor of History at Yale University
Allen Johnson (activist), African-American Civil Rights Leader and minister
Allen F. Johnson, American diplomat

See also
Alann Johnson, American politician
Alan Johnson (disambiguation)
Alan Johnston (disambiguation)